Al-Ya'abr is a sub-district located in Manakhah District, Sana'a Governorate, Yemen. Al-Ya'abr had a population of 1087 according to the 2004 census.

References 

Sub-districts in Manakhah District